The 2006–07 season was the 96th season in Hajduk Split’s history and their sixteenth in the Prva HNL. Their 5th place finish in the 2005–06 season meant it was their 16th successive season playing in the Prva HNL.

First-team squad 
Squad at end of season

Left club during season

Competitions

Overall record

Prva HNL

Classification

Results summary

Results by round

Results by opponent

Source: 2006–07 Croatian First Football League article

Matches

Prva HNL

Source: HRnogomet.com

Croatian Football Cup

Source: HRnogomet.com

Player seasonal records

Top scorers

Source: Competitive matches

See also
2006–07 Croatian First Football League
2006–07 Croatian Football Cup

References

External sources
 2006–07 Prva HNL at HRnogomet.com
 2006–07 Croatian Cup at HRnogomet.com

HNK Hajduk Split seasons
Hajduk Split